Jamshed Ali is a Bangladesh Nationalist Party politician who served as Member of Parliament for Pabna-3 from 1979 to 1986.

Career
Ali was elected to parliament from Pabna-3 as a Bangladesh Nationalist Party candidate in 1979.

References

Bangladesh Nationalist Party politicians
Living people
2nd Jatiya Sangsad members
Year of birth missing (living people)